San Lorenzo District is one of the districts of Central Department, Paraguay.

Districts of Central Department